Harri Tapio Hakkarainen (born 16 October 1969 in Kaavi) is a retired male javelin thrower from Finland. He set his personal best (87.82 metres) on 24 June 1995 in Kuortane.

Seasonal bests by year
1986 - 60.38
1987 - 63.88
1988 - 65.78
1989 - 70.06
1992 - 83.46
1993 - 84.36
1994 - 85.46
1995 - 87.82
1996 - 87.44
1997 - 86.48
1998 - 85.34
1999 - 85.00
2000 - 85.65
2001 - 83.67
2002 - 80.56
2003 - 77.52
2004 - 74.60
2005 - 74.11
2006 - 71.34
2007 - 72.07
2008 - 72.11
2009 - 70.55
2010 - 65.46
2011 - 61.20
2012 - 61.85

Achievements

References
IAAF Profile
sports-reference

1969 births
Living people
People from Kaavi
Finnish male javelin throwers
Athletes (track and field) at the 1996 Summer Olympics
Athletes (track and field) at the 2000 Summer Olympics
Olympic athletes of Finland
Sportspeople from North Savo